Events from the year 1715 in Denmark.

Incumbents
 Monarch – Frederick IV
 Grand Chancellor – Christian Christophersen Sehested

Events

 24 April – Battle of Fehmarn, naval battle of the Great Northern War.
 2 May  The Treaty of Berlin.
 8 August – Battle of Rügen, naval battle of the Great Northern War.
 24 December  Denmark's Siege of Stralsund ends.

Births
 November 30 – Johan Jacob Bruun, painter (died 1789)

Deaths
11 November – Jens Rostgaard, civil servant, judge and antiquarian (born 1650)

References

 
1710s in Denmark
Denmark
Years of the 18th century in Denmark